Camilo Daza International Airport is an international airport located in Cúcuta, Colombia. It serves the Norte de Santander Department.
 
It has international facilities and is able to operate general aviation flights to international destinations. It is named after Colombian aviation pioneer Camilo Daza.

History 
Camilo Daza International Airport was inaugurated on October 10, 1971, by the then President of the Republic, Misael Pastrana Borrero, and his Minister of Public Works, Argerino Duran Quintero. At the initiative of then President of the Society of Public Improvements, Juan Agustín Ramírez Calderón, the airport was given the name of Camilo Daza as a tribute to the aviation pioneer and founder of the Colombian Air Force.

On March 17, 1988, Avianca Flight 410, a Boeing 727 crashed on low mountains after takeoff to Cartagena's Rafael Núñez International Airport. All 143 people on board died. This was the only air accident in the history of the city.

In 2005, the Civil Aeronautics of Colombia Agency announced a renovation of the airport, seeking to transform it into one of the most modern in the nation. This renovation improved the air terminal infrastructure, provided a more contemporary design, and made air traffic safer with a powerful light at night.

The airport was renovated and expanded again from 2018 to 2019. A new facade was built, along with a new food plaza and offices for Aerocivil. The terminal was extended, the parking lot expanded to a capacity of 300 vehicles, and the check-in and baggage claim areas were renovated. The newly renovated and expanded airport was inaugurated on 26 April 2019.

2021 attack 
At around 5:00 A.M., on December 14, 2021, explosive substances being carried by a man trying to climb an airport fence detonated.

One hour later, a suitcase exploded again on the runway, resulting in the deaths of two police officers. The airport was evacuated as authorities suspended all upcoming flights. Colombian Defence Minister Diego Molano denounced the incident as a terrorist attack by left-wing guerillas based in Venezuela.

Structure and capacity 

Avianca has its own lounge with different services such as Wi-Fi, different environments, satellite television, bar meals, air conditioning and various entertainment materials.

Airlines and destinations

See also
Transport in Colombia
List of airports in Colombia

References

External links 

Cúcuta Airport at OurAirports

Airports in Colombia
Cúcuta
Buildings and structures in Norte de Santander Department
Airports established in 1971
1971 establishments in Colombia